Alumni Cantabrigienses: A Biographical List of All Known Students, Graduates and Holders of Office at the University of Cambridge, from the Earliest Times to 1900 is a biographical register of former members of the University of Cambridge which was edited by the mathematician John Venn (1834–1923) and his son John Archibald Venn (1883–1958) and published by Cambridge University Press in ten volumes between 1922 and 1953. Over 130,000 individuals are covered, with more extended biographical detail provided for post-1751 matriculants.

Publication history
John Venn, a fellow and later president of Caius College, Cambridge, began this huge project after completing a biographical register of members of his own college. Part I of Alumni Cantabrigienses, in four volumes, covered those who matriculated at Cambridge up to 1751. Although publication was delayed by World War I, Venn lived to see the first two volumes of Part I published before his death in 1923. They were a collaboration between Venn and his son, J. A. Venn, fellow and (from 1932) president of Queens' College, Cambridge: Alumni Cantabrigienses was continued by J. A. Venn as "the work which occupied him for most of his life". With support from the syndics of Cambridge University Press, the younger Venn saw the two remaining volumes of Part I through the press, and (from 1940 to 1954) six volumes comprising Part II, covering 1752–1900 matriculations.

Beyond details of an individual's progression at the University of Cambridge, the information provided in Alumni Cantabrigienses may include: dates and place of birth and death; the names of parents, siblings and spouses; schooling, occupation, and notable accomplishments; and references to sources cited. The Venns compiled Alumni Cantabrigienses from university records (matriculation registers and degree lists), written sources, and archives which included college admission registers, episcopal registers, college accounts, genealogical collections and documents in public record offices. For pre-1500 matriculations, their work has been superseded by that of A. B. Emden, but "the bulk of the work [...] has not been paralleled, let alone surpassed", and Alumni Cantabrigienses has twice been reprinted in facsimile.

Derived works 
An ongoing project at the University of Cambridge is integrating Alumni Cantabrigienses with Emden's material, registers of women's colleges (members of Girton and Newnham colleges were not given full university membership until 1947) and other sources, amounting to over 20,000 cards of addenda and corrigenda. The results are available online as a searchable database.

Volumes

Part I. From the earliest times to 1751

Part II. 1752–1900

See also 
 Alumni Oxonienses
Template:Acad

References

External links
 Searchable version at Ancestry.com
 ACAD – A Cambridge Alumni Database

1922 non-fiction books
1924 non-fiction books
1927 non-fiction books
1940 non-fiction books
1944 non-fiction books
1947 non-fiction books
1953 non-fiction books
1954 non-fiction books
British biographical dictionaries
Cambridge University Press books
University of Cambridge
Terminology of the University of Cambridge